Mamin may refer to
Mamin (name)
Mamin River in Saint Lucia
Anse Mamin, a small black sand beach in Saint Lucia

See also
Mamiña, a village in northern Chile